The Centre de Coordination de la Lutte Anti-drogue en Méditerranée or Mediterranean area anti-drug enforcement coordination centre (CeCLAD-M) is an international anti drug trafficking agency based in Toulon (France) set up in 2008 to coordinate anti-drug trafficking operations and intelligence in the Mediterranean. It is closely modeled on the Maritime Analysis and Operations Centre – Narcotics (MAOC-N) based in Lisbon.

Members
Set up on 1 December 2008, and headquartered in the French Navy base at Toulon it hosts liaison officers from six Mediterranean countries:
Spain 
Greece 
Italy 
Morocco 
Portugal
France 
In addition four other countries have made public their intention to participate as observers:
UK
Cyprus
Malta
Senegal

Mission
The Centre aims to combat maritime and air drug trafficking activities through better intelligence coordination. The main tasks of the centre are:
Contribute to better information exchange between the signatories
Act as central repository and to analyse the information provided by the signatories
Relay all useful information to the relevant forces in the signatory countries to enable effective identification, and interception of ships and planes transiting the Mediterranean
Support the forces concerned in decision making

Results
Since its inception the centre has coordinated the surveillance of 23 ships and seizures of 3 tonnes of Cannibis from ships involved in trafficking.

References

See also
Maritime Analysis and Operations Centre

Illegal drug trade
Law enforcement in Europe
Law enforcement agencies of France